This is a list of newspapers and news websites published in Montenegro.

List of publications

News websites 
 Cafe del Montenegro (CdM), Montenegrin in the Latin alphabet 
 Portal Analitika, Montenegrin in the Latin alphabet

Daily newspapers
 Pobjeda, Montenegrin in the Latin alphabet (since 1944)
 Vijesti, Montenegrin in the Latin alphabet (since 1997)
 Dan, Serbian in the Cyrillic alphabet (since 1999)
 Dnevne Novine (English: the Daily news), Montenegrin in the Latin alphabet (since 2011)

Weekly publications
 Monitor, news magazine (Montenegrin in the Montenegrin Latin alphabet)
 Arena, sports newspaper (Montenegrin in the Montenegrin Latin alphabet)
 Revija D, news magazine (Serbian in the Serbian Cyrillic alphabet)
 Objektiv, film magazine (Montenegrin in the Montenegrin Latin alphabet)

Monthly publications
 Magazin ARS, cultural magazine (Montenegrin in the Montenegrin Latin alphabet)
 Svetigora, religious and cultural magazine (Serbian in the Serbian Cyrillic alphabet)
 Matica, cultural magazine (Montenegrin in the Montenegrin Latin alphabet)
 Magazin BIT, ICT magazine (Montenegrin in the Montenegrin Latin alphabet)

Historical publications
 Crnogorac, cultural and political newspaper (from 1871 until 1873)
 Glas Crnogorca, periodical newspaper (from 1873 to 1916, 1917 until 1922)
 Narodna misao, periodical newspaper (from 1906 to 1907, 1916 until 1919)
 Cetinjski vjesnik periodical political newspaper (from 1908 until 1915)

References 

Montenegro
Newspapers